Richard Sherter (fl. 1419) of Sussex was an English politician.

He was a Member (MP) of the Parliament of England for Chichester in 1419.

References

English MPs 1419
People from Chichester